Chrysocrambus is a genus of moths of the family Crambidae described by Stanisław Błeszyński in 1957.

Species
Chrysocrambus brutiellus Bassi, 1985
Chrysocrambus chrysonuchelloides (Rothschild, 1925)
Chrysocrambus craterellus (Scopoli, 1763)
Chrysocrambus dentuellus (Pierce & Metcalfe, 1938)
Chrysocrambus kobelti (Saalmüller, 1885)
Chrysocrambus lambessellus (Caradja, 1910)
Chrysocrambus linetella (Fabricius, 1781)
Chrysocrambus major (Müller-Rutz, 1931)
Chrysocrambus mauretanicus (Müller-Rutz, 1931)
Chrysocrambus sardiniellus (Turati, 1911)
Chrysocrambus similimellus (Müller-Rutz, 1931)
Chrysocrambus syriellus (Zerny, 1934)

References

 , 1985: Contributo allo studio delle Crambinae (Lepidoptera, Pyralidae). I: Specie mediterranee nuove o interessanti. Bollettino del Museo Regionale di Scienze Naturali Torino 3 (1): 73–78.

Crambinae
Crambidae genera
Taxa named by Stanisław Błeszyński